The Wrestling Federation of India (WFI) is the governing body of wrestling in India. It is headquartered in New Delhi, India.

Wrestling in India

Notable wrestlers 
 Sushil Kumar
 Yogeshwar Dutt
 Sakshi Malik
 Bajrang Punia
 Ravi Kumar Dahiya
 Amit Dhankhar
 Phogat sisters
 Rahul Mann
 Sarita Mor

Tournaments

Pro Wrestling League 

In 2015, WFI established Pro Wrestling League tournament to promote the sport. It featured six teams representing six cities across India that consisted 11 players each, both domestic and international.

National Wrestling Championship 
The National Championships are held annually for Senior and Junior levels.

Affiliated associations 
The WFI has a total of 28 affiliated units.

 A.P. Amateur Wrestling Association
 Bihar Wrestling Association
 Chandigarh UT Wrestling Association
 Chandigarh Wrestling Association
 Delhi Amateur Wrestling Association
 Progressive Wrestling Association of Goa
 Gujarat State Wrestling Association
 Haryana Wrestling Association
 Himachal Pradesh Wrestling Association
 Jammu & Kashmir Wrestling Association
 Jharkhand Wrestling Association
 Karnataka Wrestling Association
 Kerala State Wrestling Association
 M.P. Amateur Wrestling Association
 Maharastra State Wrestling Association
 Manipur Wrestling Association
 Mizoram Wrestling Association
 Nagaland Wrestling Association
 Odisha Wrestling Association
 Punjab Wrestling Association
 Railway Sports Promotion Board
 Rajasthan Wrestling Association
 Services Sports Control Board
 Tamilnadu Amateur Wrestling Association
 Telangana State Amateur Wrestling Association
 U.P. Wrestling Association
 Wrestling Association of Uttarakhand
 West Bengal Wrestling Association

References

External links

Sports governing bodies in India
Wrestling in India
Organisations based in Delhi
Year of establishment missing
National members of the Asian Council of Associated Wrestling